Aegle subflava is a moth of the family Noctuidae. It was described by Nikolay Grigoryevich Erschoff in 1874 and is found in Kazakhstan, Turkmenistan and Tajikistan.

External links
 Listed in checklist

Hadeninae
Moths of Asia
Moths described in 1874